Bikram Vicckey Goswami was an Indian music composer. He studied at Wilson College, Mumbai. Goswami won the Zee Cine Award for best background score for the film Tere Naam. He worked as a background score composer for Dil Ne Jise Apna Kahaa (2004), Dil Maange More (2004), and Paa (2009). He also worked on several advertisements including an Audi A7 advertisement. His father Durga Goswami is the founder of Hotel Luit.

Discography  
Tere Naam (2003)
Dil Ne Jise Apna Kahaa (2004)
 Dil Maange More (2004)
Paa (2009)

Death 
He died on 12 June 2019 due to stomach cancer. He was diagnosed with cancer one month earlier.

References 

Indian composers
2019 deaths
People from Assam
Zee Cine Awards winners